Paul Wilson McKay (born 28 January 1971) is an English former professional footballer who played as a full back. He played twelve matches in the Football League for Burnley, before moving into non-league football with Slough Town in 1993. He made his Burnley debut on 18 December 1989, replacing Roger Eli in the 5–0 victory over Scunthorpe United in the FA Cup.

References

Paul McKay profile at claretsmad.co.uk

1971 births
Living people
Sportspeople from Banbury
English footballers
Association football defenders
Burnley F.C. players
Slough Town F.C. players
English Football League players